Otso Rantakari (born November 19, 1993) is a Finnish professional ice hockey defenceman who is currently playing with Tappara of the Liiga.

Playing career
Rantakari made his Liiga debut playing with Espoo Blues during the 2014–15 Liiga season.

On September 9, 2019, Rantakari was signed to a four-month tryout by HC Davos of the Swiss National League (NL) through December 31, 2019. On November 30, 2019, Rantakari was signed to a one-year contract by Davos through the end of the 2019/20 season. On January 21, 2020, Rantakari was loaned to EHC Biel to replace injured Anssi Salmela.

On 18 June 2020, Rantakari left Switzerland as a free agent and agreed to a one-year deal with Russian club, HC Neftekhimik Nizhnekamsk of the Kontinental Hockey League (KHL).

On July 30, 2021 he married Miss Finland 2010, Viivi Pumpanen.

References

External links

1993 births
Living people
EHC Biel players
HC Davos players
Espoo Blues players
Finnish ice hockey defencemen
Kiekko-Vantaa players
Modo Hockey players
HC Neftekhimik Nizhnekamsk players
Tappara players
Sportspeople from Espoo